The Faroese Footballer of the Year is an annual award chosen by a national newspaper, Sosialurin, to determine the best player in the Faroe Islands.

Winners

Notes

References

Association football player of the year awards by nationality
Football in the Faroe Islands